Events in the year 1752 in Norway.

Incumbents
Monarch: Frederick V

Events
10 November – Holmestrand received city rights.
Seminarium Lapponicum established in Trondheim, a school for preparing teachers to teach in Sami language.

Births
Jens Holmboe, bailiff (died 1839).

See also

References